The Baseball Writers' Association of America (BBWAA) is a professional association for journalists writing about Major League Baseball for daily newspapers, magazines and qualifying websites. The organization was founded in 1908, and is known for its annual awards and voting on membership in the Baseball Hall of Fame.

Early years
The BBWAA was founded on October 14, 1908, to improve working conditions for sportswriters in the early part of the 20th century; It also sought to promote uniformity of scoring methods, and to professionalize the press box, such that access was limited only to working reporters, telegraphers, and others who had a reason to be there. 

The organization began with 43 founding members. They included Joe S. Jackson, who became the association's first president. At that time, Jackson was the sporting editor (today called sports editor) of the Detroit Free Press. Also selected as officers were Irving E. Sanborn of the Chicago Tribune, syndicated columnist Hugh Fullerton, and The Boston Globe baseball writer Tim Murnane A second meeting was held in New York City in December; Sanborn decided he could not serve as an officer at that time, and he was replaced by William Weart of the Philadelphia Times. The slate of officers was ratified, and anyone who wrote about baseball in major league cities was eligible for membership. This policy changed, however, in December 1913, at which time it was decided that minor league baseball writers could also become members. Then, Jackson became a dominant force in the early years of the baseball writers, being elected as president of the association during nine consecutive terms. 

Jackson finally retired in 1919, while Sanborn returned to assume the position of president. After that, Jackson became a member of the BBWAA Board of Directors.

Mission
The organization's primary function is to work with Major League Baseball and individual teams to assure clubhouse and press-box access for BBWAA members. In addition, BBWAA members also elect players to the National Baseball Hall of Fame, which is the organization's most public function. All writers with 10 continuous years of membership in the BBWAA, plus active BBWAA membership at any time in the preceding 10 years, are eligible to vote for the Hall of Fame. The BBWAA also votes annually for the Kenesaw Mountain Landis Most Valuable Player Award, Cy Young Award, Jackie Robinson Rookie of the Year Award, and Manager of the Year Award in each of the two major leagues. The Hall of Fame also empowers the BBWAA's Historical Overview Committee, made up of 11 or 12 veteran BBWAA members, to formulate the annual ballot for the Veterans Committee.

Considering the ready availability of television broadcasts for the majority of baseball games, plus instant access to information through the Internet, some have called into question why the BBWAA has not broadened its membership rules to include broadcasters and researchers. (Similar arguments were made for the inclusion of Web-based journalists, before the BBWAA added Web writers to its ranks in December 2007.)

Others have openly questioned why the BBWAA is involved in the award and Hall of Fame voting processes at all, citing in some cases journalistic integrity and the need to remain unbiased in their coverage of newsworthy events.

Awards voting
The BBWAA's most public function is to annually vote on candidates for the National Baseball Hall of Fame. The Out of the Park Baseball video game gives players the chance to participate in the BBWAA's election.

In addition, the BBWAA is responsible for voting on several annual awards in each major league, including:
Most Valuable Player Award
Cy Young Award
Jackie Robinson Rookie of the Year Award
Manager of the Year Award

In or about 2000, the BBWAA took over the voting responsibility for the Edgar Martínez Award, given each year to the outstanding designated hitter in the American League.

From 1953 to 1962, the BBWAA presented a "Sophomore of the Year Award" in each league.

In 1997, a 36-member BBWAA panel selected the Major League Baseball All-Time Team.

Awards display
Replicas of various BBWAA awards and lists of past winners are displayed at the National Baseball Hall of Fame and Museum, in the Records Room, which also has other exhibits, including charts showing active and all-time leaders in various baseball statistical categories.

BBWAA Career Excellence Award

The annual BBWAA Career Excellence Award is the highest award given by the BBWAA. First awarded in 1962 to J. G. Taylor Spink, longtime publisher of The Sporting News, it was named the J. G. Taylor Spink Award until adopting its current name in February 2021. It has been awarded annually for "meritorious contributions to baseball writing", except for one year during the 1994–95 Major League Baseball strike. Recipients are not considered members of the National Baseball Hall of Fame, but are permanently recognized in an exhibit at the Hall's library.

Web membership
In 2007, the BBWAA opened its membership to web-based writers employed on a full-time basis by "websites that are credentialed by MLB for post-season coverage."

Chapter awards

New York chapter
For information about the chapter and its presiding officer, see footnote and Red Foley (past chairman).

National awards presented at chapter dinner
Most Valuable Player Award (one for each league) (voted on by the national BBWAA)
Cy Young Award (one for each league) (voted on by the national BBWAA)
Jackie Robinson Rookie of the Year Award (one for each league) (voted on by the national BBWAA)
Manager of the Year Award (one for each league) (voted on by the national BBWAA)

Chapter awards
Babe Ruth Award (postseason MVP since 2007; was awarded to the MVP of the World Series from 1949 to 2006)
New York Player of the Year Award (formerly the Sid Mercer–Dick Young Player of the Year Award)
Arthur and Milton Richman "You Gotta Have Heart" Award
Joan Payson/Shannon Forde Award (formerly the Joan Payson Award, until 2016) (for excellence in community service)
Casey Stengel "You Can Look It Up" Award (to honor career achievement for those who went home empty-handed at previous dinners)
Joe DiMaggio "Toast of the Town" Award (for a player who has become a New York favorite)
William J. Slocum–Jack Lang Award (for long and meritorious service)
Ben Epstein–Dan Castellano "Good Guy" Award (for candor and accessibility to writers)
Willie, Mickey and the Duke Award (to a group of players forever linked in baseball history)

Other chapters

Cincinnati: Cincinnati Reds Hall of Fame (voting by Cincinnati chapter since 1998)
 Cincinnati: Ernie Lombardi Award (team MVP)
 Cincinnati: Team Pitcher of the Year
Cleveland: Bob Feller Man of the Year Award (player or other team personnel) (since 1946)
Cleveland: Frank Gibbons-Steve Olin Good Guy Award (since 1968)
Detroit: Tiger of the Year (since 1965)
Houston: Darryl Kile Good Guy Award (since 2003)
Minnesota:
 Montreal: Montreal Expos Player of the Year (discontinued in 2004)
Philadelphia: Most Valuable Player, Most Valuable Pitcher, Special Achievement, Good Guy Award, and  Charlie Manuel Award for Service and Passion to Baseball (since 2004)
St. Louis: Darryl Kile Good Guy Award (since 2003)
Toronto: Neil MacCarl Award (since 1977)
Note: The MLB Rookie of the Year Award was established by the Chicago chapter in 1940 and was known as the J. Louis Comiskey Memorial Award (after the Chicago White Sox owner of the 1930s). In 1947, the award became an official MLB award (voted on by the national BBWAA), with Jackie Robinson as its first recipient. In July 1987, the award was renamed the Jackie Robinson Award (see , above).

Presidents
For a list of presidents and secretaries from 1908 to the present, see footnote
During the 2012 World Series, the Association elected its first female president, Susan Slusser, of the San Francisco Chronicle.

List of members

Names of members are followed by the name of the organization for whom they write.

Through the 2000s, writers for The New York Times, The Washington Post, and The Baltimore Sun said that they were no longer permitted by their employers to vote for the organization's awards. The New York Times said in 2021 that their writers have been prohibited from participating in any awards-giving body since 1989, under the rationale that "journalists should report the news, not help make it". The Los Angeles Times has a similar policy, though it appears to be negotiable.

Peter Abraham, The Boston Globe 
J. A. Adande, ESPN.com, formerly the Los Angeles Times
Dave Albee, Marin Independent Journal
Jim Alexander, The Press-Enterprise
Dom Amore, Hartford Courant
Mel Antonen, USA Today
Tom Archdeacon, Dayton Daily News
Nancy Armour, Associated Press
Phil Arvia, SouthtownStar
Steve Aschburner, Honorary
Chris Assenheimer, Elyria (Oh) Chronicle-Telegram
Andrew Baggarly, Bay Area News Group
Geoff Baker, The Seattle Times
Bill Ballou, Telegram & Gazette of Worcester
Mike Bass, St. Paul Pioneer Press
Bob Baum, Associated Press
Mike Bauman, MLB.com
Rod Beard, The Detroit News
Jon Becker, Bay Area News Group
Ira Berkow, The New York Times
Rob Biertempfel, Pittsburgh Tribune-Review
Jeff Blair, The Globe and Mail
Barry Bloom, MLB.com
Ron Blum, Associated Press
Paul Bodi, MLB.com
Hal Bodley, USA Today
Thomas Boswell, The Washington Post (non-voting member)
Pat Borzi, The New York Times (non-voting member)
Peter Botte, NY Daily News
Ed Bouchette, Pittsburgh Post-Gazette
 Mark Bradley, The Atlanta Journal-Constitution
Marcos Breton, Sacramento Bee
Bob Brookover, Philadelphia News
Steve Buckley, Boston Herald
Don Burke, Newark Star-Ledger
Pete Caldera, Bergen (NJ) Record
Dave Cameron, Fangraphs
Dave Campbell, Associated Press
Mark Camps, Honorary
John Canzano, The Oregonian
Jim Caple, ESPN
Pat Caputo, Oakland Press
Sam Carchidi, The Philadelphia Inquirer
Marc Carig, New Jersey Star Ledger
Will Carroll, Bleacher Report
Bill Center, U-T San Diego
Murray Chass, www.murraychass.com
Ron Chimelis, The Republican (Springfield, Massachusetts)
Joe Christensen, Minneapolis Star Tribune
Bill Christine, Honorary
Carson Cistulli, Fangraphs
Frank Clines, Honorary
Jay Cohen, Associated Press
Gene Collier, Pittsburgh Post-Gazette
Dan Connolly, The Baltimore Sun
Ron Cook, Pittsburgh Post-Gazette
Jose Covarrubias, retired
Joe Cowley, Chicago Sun-Times
Jerry Crasnick, ESPN
Dave Cunningham, Honorary
Ken Daley, Honorary
Ken Davidoff, New York Post
Art Davidson, The MetroWest Daily News
Jose de Jesus Ortiz, Houston Chronicle
Tony DeMarco, Honorary
Mike DiGiovanna, Los Angeles Times
Steve Dilbeck, Los Angeles Daily News
Mike Dodd, USA Today
Mike Downey, retired
Paul Doyle, Hartford Courant
Rich Draper, MLB.com
Josh Dubow, Associated Press
Rich Dubroff, CSNmidatlantic.com
Bob Dutton, The News Tribune
Mike Dyer, Long Island Press, retired
Gordon Edes, ESPN
Bob Elliott, Toronto Sun
Eduardo Encina, The Baltimore Sun
John Erardi, The Cincinnati Enquirer
Gerald Eskenazi, The New York Times
August Fagerstrom, Fangraphs
Mark Faller, The Arizona Republic
John Fay, The Cincinnati Enquirer
Mark Feinsand, The Daily News
Anthony Fenech, Detroit Free Press
Ken Fidlin, Toronto Sun
Mike Fine, Honorary
John R. Finger, CSNPhilly.com
Mike Fitzpatrick, Associated Press
Jeffrey Flanagan, MLB.com
Jeff Fletcher, The Orange County Register
 Sean Forman, Sports Reference LLC
Gerry Fraley, The Dallas Morning News
Tom Gage, The Detroit News
Peter Gammons, MLB Network
Jim Gauger, Trenton Times, retired
Steven Gietschier, Sporting News, retired
Dave Ginsburg, Associated Press
Rich Glanzer, Lynbrook Times Gazette
Ben Goessling, MASN
Steve Goldman, Ashtabula Star Beacon
Steven Goldman, Baseball Prospectus
Jimmy Golen, Associated Press
Mark Gonzalez, Chicago Tribune
Derrick Goold, St. Louis Post-Dispatch
Pat Graham, Associated Press
Evan Grant, The Dallas Morning News
Jerry Green, The Detroit News
Richard Griffin, Toronto Star
Stephen Gross, The Morning Call
Ken Gurnick, MLB.com
Paul Hagen, MLB.com
Mike Harrington, The Buffalo News
Jim Hawkins, The Oakland Press,
Joe Henderson, Tampa Tribune,
Lynn Henning, The Detroit News
Steve Henson, USA TODAY/Gannett
Jon Heyman, Sports Illustrated
Myron Holtzman, St. Louis Globe-Democrat, retired
Jeff Horrigan, Boston Herald
Garry D. Howard, Sporting News
Paul Hoynes, The Plain Dealer
Rick Hummel, St. Louis Post-Dispatch
Bob Hunter, Columbus Dispatch
Jim Ingraham, The News-Herald (Ohio)
Jeff Jacobs, Hartford Courant
Jay Jaffe, Baseball Prospectus
Bruce Jenkins, San Francisco Chronicle
Chris Jenkins, Associated Press
Chuck Johnson, USA Today
Richard Justice, Houston Chronicle
Dick Kaegel, MLB.com
Christina Kahrl, Baseball Prospectus
Joe Kay, Associated Press
Tyler Kepner, The New York Times 
Ann Killion, San Francisco Chronicle
Bob Klapisch, ESPN
Mike Klis, The Denver Post
Gwen Knapp, San Francisco Chronicle
Michael Knisley, ESPN
Danny Knobler, CBSSports.com
Nobuyuki Kobayashi, Tokyo Daily Sports
Dejan Kovacevic, Pittsburgh Post-Gazette
Steven Krasner, The Providence Journal
Dave Krieger, The Denver Post
Doug Krikorian, Long Beach Press-Telegram
Roch Kubatko, MASNSports.com
Tim Kurkjian, ESPN
Paul Ladewski, Chicago Baseball Museum
Leonte Landino, ESPN Deportes
Scott Lauber, Boston Herald
Keith Law, ESPN
Gil LeBreton, Fort Worth Star-Telegram
Mike Lefkow, Contra Costa Times
Joseph Liao, World Journal 
Ben Lindbergh, Baseball Prospectus
Bill Livingston, The Plain Dealer
Seth Livingstone, USA Today
John Lowe, Detroit Free Press
Rob Maaddi, Associated Press
Bill Madden, New York Daily News
Dennis Manoloff, The Plain Dealer
Tony Massarotti, The Boston Globe
Sean McAdam, CSNNE
Janie McCauley, Associated PressCory McCartney, FOX Sports SouthHal McCoy, Dayton Daily NewsDan McGrath, Chicago TribuneJack McCaffery, Delaware County TimesStan McNeal, Sporting News 
Paul Meyer, Pittsburgh Post-Gazette
Bernie Miklasz, ESPN Radio
Scott Miller, CBS Sportsline
Larry Milson, The Globe and Mail
Jim Molony, MLB.com
Robert Morales, Los Angeles Daily News 
Ernest Moreno, MLB.com
Chuck Murr, Associated Press
Carrie Muskat, MLB.com
La Velle E. Neale III, Minneapolis Star Tribune Past President of BBWAA
Mark Newman, MLB.com<ref name="autogenerated1"/]
Rob Neyer, ESPN
Lisa Nehus Saxon, retired"
Bob Nightengale, USA Today
Marty Noble, MLB.com
David O'Brien, The Atlanta Journal-Constitution
Sheldon Ocker, Akron Beacon Journal
Jack O'Connell, BBWAA
Dave O'Hara, retired
Buster Olney, ESPN
Scott Orgera, Sports Press Service
Woody Paige, The Denver Post
Rob Parker, The Detroit News
Tony Paul, The Detroit News
Jeff Peek, Traverse City Record-Eagle
John Perrotto, Beaver County Times
Mike Peticca, The Plain Dealer
Bill Plaschke, Los Angeles Times (non-voting member)
Terry Pluto, The Plain Dealer
Joe Posnanski, The Kansas City Star
Mark Purdy, San Jose Mercury News
Ryan Pyner, MLB.com
Luis E. Rangel, El Nuevo Herald 
Ron Rapoport, retired
Ricardo Montes de Oca, Actualidad Media Group
Ray Ratto, San Francisco Chronicle
Marla Ridenour, Akron Beacon Journal
Tracy Ringolsby, Rocky Mountain News
Joe Rivera, Sporting News
Lawrence "Larry" Rocca, Honorary
Juan C. Rodriguez, Sun-Sentinel
Phil Rogers, ESPN
John Romano, St. Petersburg Times
Bob Rosen, Elias Sports Bureau
Ken Rosenthal, The Athletic
Roger Rubin, New York Daily News
Jim Salisbury, CSNPhilly.com, formerly The Philadelphia Inquirer
Eno Sarris, Fangraphs
Peter Schmuck, The Baltimore Sun (non-voting member); elected President of the BBWAA in 2005.
Russ Schneider, The Plain Dealer; retired
Jeff Schultz, The Atlanta Journal-Constitution
Alan Schwarz, Baseball America
Chaz Scoggins, The Sun of Lowell
Dan Shaughnessy, The Boston Globe
Bud Shaw, The Plain Dealer
John Shea, San Francisco Chronicle
Joel Sherman, New York Post
Bob Sherwin, Associated Press/Seattle
Michael Silverman, Boston Herald
Dave Skretta, Associated Press
Susan Slusser, San Francisco Chronicle
Claire Smith, ESPN
Christopher Smith, MassLive.com
Bob Smizik, Pittsburgh Post-Gazette
Jim Souhan, Star Tribune (Minneapolis)
Lyle Spencer, MLB.com
Alex Speier, WEEI-FM
Barry Stanton, ESPN
Jayson Stark, ESPN
Kit Stier, The Journal News
Joe Stiglich, Contra Costa Times
Pat Stoetzer, Carroll County Times
Larry Stone, The Seattle Times
Jim Street, MLB.com
Paul Sullivan, Chicago Tribune
T.R. Sullivan, MLB.com
Connor Fitter, MLB.com
Marc Topkin, Tampa Bay Times
Howard Ulman, Associated Press
Dave van Dyck, Chicago Tribune
Juan Vene, VIP Wire
Tom Verducci, Sports Illustrated
Ben Walker, Associated Press
Tadashi Watanabe, Kyodo News
Tom Withers, Associated Press
Gordon Wittenmyer, Chicago Sun Times
Akiko Yamawaki, Hochi Shimbun
Yasuko Yanagita, Associated Press
Mark Zuckerman, Nats Insider, CSNwashington.com

See also

Honor Rolls of Baseball (writers)
Baseball awards
List of MLB awards
CASEY Award (best baseball book of the year)
Official scorer
National Collegiate Baseball Writers Association
National Sports Media Association
Pro Basketball Writers Association
United States Basketball Writers Association (college)
Football Writers Association of America (college)
Pro Football Writers Association
Professional Hockey Writers Association

Footnotes

"Baseball Writers Unite." Washington Post, October 15, 1908, p. 9.

Further reading

External links

Annual Awards (2003–present). BBWAA official website
Hall of Fame. BBWAA official website
Voting FAQ (national awards and HoF). BBWAA official website
Constitution. BBWAA official website
MLB Awards and Baseball Hall of Fame Results. Baseball-Reference.com (including HOF inductees, Hall of Famer Batting and Pitching Stats, HOF Ballot and Voting Summaries, Projected or Official Ballots for 2012 to 2015, Voting Results for 1936 to present, and "Most times in the All-Star Game")

Baseball mass media
 
National Baseball Hall of Fame and Museum
Baseball in the United States
Baseball organizations
American sports journalism organizations
Major League Baseball mass media
Journalism-related professional associations
Sports organizations established in 1908
1908 establishments in the United States